Orestheus (Ancient Greek:  derived from oresteros "mountainous" from όρος oros "mountain, hill"), in Greek mythology, was a name attributed to two individuals.

Orestheus, a king of the Ozolian Locrians in Aetolia. He was the son of Deucalion and Pyrrha, the legendary progenitors of the Greek race. Orestheus was the brother of Pronous and Marathonius. His dog was said to have given birth to a piece of wood which he concealed in the earth. In the spring, a vine grew forth from it, from the sprouts of which (Greek ὅζοι ozoi "branches") Orestheus derived the name of his people.
Orestheus, an Arcadian prince as one of the 50 sons of the impious King Lycaon either by the naiad Cyllene, Nonacris or by unknown woman. He was the reputed founder of Arcadian Oresthasion, which is said afterwards to have been called Oresteion, from Orestes.

Notes

References 
Apollodorus, The Library with an English Translation by Sir James George Frazer, F.B.A., F.R.S. in 2 Volumes, Cambridge, MA, Harvard University Press; London, William Heinemann Ltd. 1921. ISBN 0-674-99135-4. Online version at the Perseus Digital Library. Greek text available from the same website.
Dionysus of Halicarnassus, Roman Antiquities. English translation by Earnest Cary in the Loeb Classical Library, 7 volumes. Harvard University Press, 1937-1950. Online version at Bill Thayer's Web Site
Dionysius of Halicarnassus, Antiquitatum Romanarum quae supersunt, Vol I-IV. . Karl Jacoby. In Aedibus B.G. Teubneri. Leipzig. 1885. Greek text available at the Perseus Digital Library.
Pausanias, Description of Greece with an English translation by W.H.S. Jones, Litt.D., and H.A. Ormerod, M.A., in 4 Volumes. Cambridge, MA, Harvard University Press; London, William Heinemann Ltd. 1918. . Online version at the Perseus Digital Library
Pausanias, Graeciae Descriptio. 3 vols. Leipzig, Teubner. 1903.  Greek text available at the Perseus Digital Library.
William Smith, Ed. A Dictionary of Greek and Roman Biography and Mythology  - Orestheus

Deucalionids
Sons of Lycaon
Princes in Greek mythology
Thessalian characters in Greek mythology
Mythological kings of Arcadia
Kings in Greek mythology
Arcadian characters in Greek mythology
Arcadian mythology
Locrians